Needle bush is a common name for several plants and may refer to:

Hakea lissosperma, native to Tasmania and southeastern Australia
Hakea preissii native to Western Australia
Vachellia farnesiana, native to the Americas but widely naturalized in tropical regions

See also
 Pincushion tree